Ed Cavanaugh (born August 24, 1928) is a former American football player and coach.

Cavanaugh played college football at Duke University; he was a guard and graduated in 1951.

In his third season at Idaho State in 1970, the university opened the indoor Minidome (now Holt Arena).

Head coaching record

References

1928 births
Living people
Arizona Wildcats football coaches
Army Black Knights football coaches
Duke Blue Devils football players
Idaho State Bengals football coaches
Kansas State Wildcats football coaches
Miami Hurricanes football coaches
Rhode Island Rams football coaches
Utah State Aggies football coaches
Sportspeople from Waterbury, Connecticut